Paeonia ostii is a hardy shrub in the peony family, Paeoniaceae. It can be found in the Gansu, Anhui, Shaanxi and Henan provinces of China. It can reach heights of 1.5 m with grey-brown bark and lance shaped leaflets.  Flowers are produced in mid-spring, up to 15 cm across, and pure white without basal blotches. The flowers can sometimes be faintly tinged with pink.

This species is the parent of two medicinal varieties of tree peonies.  'Feng Dan Bai' (Phoenix White) and 'Feng Dan Fen' (Phoenix Pink) are grown for the bark of their roots which is used as an antispasmodic throughout Asia.

References

ostii
Flora of China
Plants described in 1992